"Killer Queen" is a song by the British rock band Queen. It was written by lead singer Freddie Mercury and recorded for their third album Sheer Heart Attack in 1974. It reached number two in the UK Singles Chart and became their first US hit, reaching number twelve on the Billboard Hot 100. The song is about a high-class call girl and has been characterised as "Mercury's piano-led paean to a Moët-quaffing courtesan".

The song is included in Queen's 1981 Greatest Hits compilation. It is also recorded on the live albums Live Killers and Queen Rock Montreal.

History and recording
Mercury commented he wrote the lyrics before the melody and music, whereas normally he would do the opposite. He stated that the song was about a high-class call girl. The song's first verse quotes a phrase traditionally attributed to Marie Antoinette: "'Let them eat cake,' she says, Just like Marie Antoinette". "Killer Queen" retained the essence of Queen's trademark sound, particularly in its meticulous vocal harmonies.

Unlike the first two Queen albums, this song was partly recorded at Rockfield Studios in Wales. The recording features elaborate four-part harmonies (particularly in the choruses, and also providing backing parts in the verses), and also a multitracked guitar solo by Brian May which makes use of the bell effect. At one point there are two distinct bass guitar lines, one of which diverges into a descending run.

Release
When released as a single, "Killer Queen" was Queen's breakthrough hit, reaching number two in the United Kingdom and number twelve in the United States. It was released as a double A-side in the UK, the US, and Canada (where it reached number 15 in the RPM 100 national singles chart), with the song "Flick of the Wrist". Several different versions of "Flick of the Wrist" were used on different releases. In 1986, "Killer Queen" featured as the B-side to "Who Wants to Live Forever".

Queen on the song
Freddie Mercury:

Brian May:

Live performances 

The song was regularly performed between 1974 and 1981 as part of a medley. In 1974–75, the song was played following "In the Lap of the Gods", and in 1975–76, the song followed "Bohemian Rhapsody". In 1984 and 1985, during The Works Tour, it was reintroduced in a medley following a truncated version of "Somebody to Love".

Critical reception and legacy
"Killer Queen" has been described by AllMusic as the true beginning of Queen's "radio sound" and "recalls the cabaret songs of yesteryear, but also shows how Queen was fast becoming a master of power pop". Rock historian Paul Fowles wrote that "Killer Queen", with its "sleazy Parisian imagery", allowed "free rein" to Mercury's "unique brand of rock theater".

Cash Box said that it had "fine lead vocals, solid harmonies and an inventive production" and that "this song is bound to make you smile with its lighthearted whimsy and confident approach."  Record World described it as "a cross between Bowie and Wings."

American pop singer Katy Perry cites "Killer Queen" as an important influence on her, saying it "made me discover music and helped me come into my own at the age of 15".

Personnel
Freddie Mercury – lead vocals and backing vocals, grand piano, tack piano, finger snapping
Brian May – electric guitar, backing vocals
Roger Taylor – drums, triangle, chimes, backing vocals
John Deacon – bass guitar

Chart performance

Weekly charts

Year-end charts

Sales and certifications

5 Seconds of Summer version

 
In October 2018, Australian band 5 Seconds of Summer released a version of the song ahead of release of Queen's biopic, Bohemian Rhapsody. The cover was released to support the Mercury Phoenix Trust, an organization founded by Queen's band members that aims to provide support in the fight against HIV/AIDS.
 
The song was released to coincide with the release of the film Bohemian Rhapsody. Universal Music Group released 3 tracks by different artists' channeling their inner Freddie Mercury; this is the second installment, following Shawn Mendes' "Under Pressure" released two weeks earlier.
 
According to 5 Seconds of Summer, Queen's "unique harmonies, the fluidity to their songwriting and how they each used their own musicality to back each other up have always inspired us. For us, the exploration of individual vocalists in a band is incredibly important and Queen helped us to see the future of how we want to sing, in addition to how we play our instruments." A portion of the profits from the "Killer Queen" cover will be donated to Mercury Phoenix Trust, which was founded by Queen's Brian May and Roger Taylor (and the group's manager, Jim Beach) after Mercury's death to help fight AIDS worldwide.

Reception
Brooke Bajgrowicz from Billboard said "The four-piece pop rock band launch into the anthemic a cappella chorus from the get-go... By the time the full-force chorus arrives, the fluid harmonies and catchy phrasing are instantly recognizable. While somewhat modernised, the single fades out in a style similar to the original Queen banger, and other '70s hits of the time". Daniel Kreps from Rolling Stone called the version "Faithful".

Charts

References

External links
 Lyrics at Queen official website
 

1974 songs
1974 singles
2018 singles
Queen (band) songs
5 Seconds of Summer songs
Songs written by Freddie Mercury
Song recordings produced by Roy Thomas Baker
Elektra Records singles
EMI Records singles
Hollywood Records singles
Virgin EMI Records singles
Glam rock songs
Art pop songs
British power pop songs
Songs about prostitutes
Charity singles